Paracles persimilis is a moth of the subfamily Arctiinae first described by Hermann Burmeister in 1878. It is found in Brazil.

References

Moths described in 1878
Paracles